Heredity may refer to:

Heredity: the transfer of characteristics from parent to offspring
Inheritance: the hereditary transfer of titles, property, or assets from parent to offspring (or other beneficiary)
A synonym for bloodline; for other uses of the term, see Bloodline (disambiguation)
Hereditary property, in mathematics, a property of objects inherited by all their subobjects
Heredity (journal), a scientific journal
"Heredity" (short story), a science fiction story by Isaac Asimov
 Heredity (film), a 1912 film starring Harry Carey
 Hereditary (film), a 2018 film starring Toni Collette
 Heredity (album), a 1985 album by Rational Youth